Aladagudde  is a village in the southern state of Karnataka, India. It is located in the Chikkamagaluru Taluk of Chikkamagaluru District in Karnataka.

See also
 Chikkamagaluru
 Districts of Karnataka

References

External links
 http://www.chickmagalur.nic.in/

Villages in Chikkamagaluru district